The 2019 UIM F1 H2O World Championship was the 36th season of Formula 1 Powerboat racing.

Teams and drivers

Season calendar

Results and standings
Points are awarded to the top 10 classified finishers. A maximum of two boats per team are eligible for points in the teams' championship.

Drivers standings

Notes

2019 in motorsport
2019
2019 in boat racing